Samakh can mean:
 Samakh, Tiberias, an depopulated  former Palestinian village at the south end of the Sea of Galilee in Israel
 Samekh, a letter in the Hebrew and various other Semitic alphabets